Seitlinger is a surname. Notable people with the name include:

 Jean Seitlinger (1924–2018), French politician
 Vincent Seitlinger (his son) (born 1987), French politician

See also 

 Ralph Seitsinger

Surnames
Surnames of French origin